George Elmer "Del" Howard (December 24, 1877 – December 24, 1956) was a Major League Baseball player from 1905 to 1909. He would play for the Pittsburgh Pirates, Boston Beaneaters/Doves, and Chicago Cubs.  Howard appeared in 536 games and retired with six home runs, 193 RBI and a lifetime .263 batting average.

He had a career-high 142 hits for Boston during the 1906 season. Howard then played for the Cubs in both the 1907 and 1908 World Series, winning two championships.

References

External links

 

1877 births
1956 deaths
Major League Baseball outfielders
Major League Baseball infielders
Pittsburgh Pirates players
Boston Beaneaters players
Boston Doves players
Chicago Cubs players
Baseball players from Illinois
People from DeWitt County, Illinois
Omaha Rangers players
Omaha Rourkes players
Louisville Colonels (minor league) managers
Louisville Colonels (minor league) players
St. Paul Saints (AA) players
San Francisco Seals (baseball) managers
San Francisco Seals (baseball) players
Lawrence Barristers players
New London Planters players
Oakland Oaks (baseball) managers
Oakland Oaks (baseball) players